Colombia sent a delegation to compete at the 2008 Summer Paralympics in Beijing, China.

Medalists

Sports

Athletics

Men's track

Cycling

Men's road

Men's track

Judo

Powerlifting

Men

Swimming

Men

Women

Wheelchair tennis

See also
Colombia at the Paralympics
Colombia at the 2008 Summer Olympics

External links
International Paralympic Committee

References 

Nations at the 2008 Summer Paralympics
2008
Summer Paralympics